Sliven Airfield  is a military airport located near Sliven, Sliven, Bulgaria.

See also
List of airports in Bulgaria

References

External links 
 Airport record for Sliven Airfield at Landings.com

Airports in Bulgaria
Sliven Province